The  is a professional wrestling tournament held each August by the New Japan Pro-Wrestling (NJPW) promotion. Though it has sometimes been held as a single-elimination tournament, it is usually (and currently) held as a round-robin, with winners from two pools wrestling in the final to decide that year's winner. In its current format, the tournament lasts four weeks. The winner of each pool is determined by a points system; two points for a victory, one point for a draw (time limit only), and zero points for a loss, no contest or double decision.

Tournament history

Most of these tournaments were dominated by NJPW's founding top star Antonio Inoki.

Although the 1983 winner, Hulk Hogan, was awarded a championship belt, this is not the beginning of the IWGP Heavyweight Championship, but its early version that was defended annually against the winner of the IWGP League of the year. The current IWGP Heavyweight Championship arrived only in 1987, replacing the old version.

No tournament was held in 1990.

With Inoki's dominance over NJPW gone, the promotion established the G1 Climax tournament in 1991 as a platform to showcase the company's top heavyweights and have them compete in round-robin matches where the winners of the two divisions would then square off in the tournament final. NJPW's then president Seiji Sakaguchi named the tournament after the G1 horse race. Though considered a continuation of the previous tournaments, officially NJPW does not recognize the earlier tournaments as part of the G1 Climax lineage. The first G1 was held from August 7 to August 11, 1991, at Tokyo's Ryōgoku Kokugikan. The winner of the tournament, assuming they are not already the champion, has traditionally earned a shot at the IWGP Heavyweight Championship. Since 2012, the winner has earned the "Tokyo Dome IWGP Heavyweight Championship challenge rights certificate", a contract for a title shot at NJPW's largest event, Wrestle Kingdom in Tokyo Dome, held annually on January 4. Much like WWE's Money in the Bank contract, the certificate is kept in a briefcase that the wrestler then has to defend until the end of the year. Since its inception, the contract has only changed hands one time, on November 7, 2020 at Power Struggle when Jay White defeated Kota Ibushi. In 2021, the now retired IWGP Heavyweight Championship belt was given to G1 winner Kazuchika Okada instead of a briefcase. In 2015, the tournament format was changed with NJPW reducing the number of G1 Climax matches per show, giving the participating wrestlers more time to rest between matches. This increased the tournament's length to four weeks. In 2016, Kenny Omega became the first non-Japanese wrestler to win the tournament.

The G1 Climax tournament has often been used as a platform for NJPW to push their rising stars. Wins by young up-and-comers over Japanese legends would usually take their respective careers to new heights. The first tournament was specifically created to make stars out of Keiji Mutoh, Masahiro Chono and Shinya Hashimoto, three NJPW wrestlers who had just returned to the promotion from their overseas learning excursions. Past winners include Mutoh, Chono, Hashimoto, Yuji Nagata, Hiroshi Tanahashi, and others who have gone on to become wrestling superstars.

Unlike the New Japan Cup, the G1 Climax features the then-reigning IWGP Heavyweight Champion as one of the participants, except in 1992, 2001, 2004 and 2008, when then-champions Riki Choshu (in 1992), Kazuyuki Fujita (in 2001 and 2004), and Keiji Mutoh (in 2008), respectively, did not compete in the tournament. Often being labeled as a favorite to win the tournament, the IWGP Heavyweight Champion has reached the final five times, the first one being in 1995 when Keiji Mutoh won the tournament. Mutoh would repeat this feat again in 1999, but would lose the final to Manabu Nakanishi. Other then-reigning champions to reach the final include Kensuke Sasaki in 2000, Kazuyuki Fujita in 2005 and Yuji Nagata in 2007. Mutoh and Sasaki are the only two wrestlers to have won the G1 Climax while holding the IWGP Heavyweight Championship. Overall, Antonio Inoki holds the record for most tournament wins with ten, while Masahiro Chono with his five wins holds the record for most tournament wins under its G1 Climax name. Hiroyoshi Tenzan has taken part in the G1 Climax tournament a record 21 times.

The opening night of the 2019 G1 Climax took place in Dallas, Texas, marking the first time the opening night took place outside Japan.

The finals for the 2020 G1 Climax took place in October due to the Summer Olympics originally intended to be held in Tokyo when the tournament is usually held, making this the first time the tournament took place in the Autumn.

The longest match in tournament history is Kota Ibushi vs. Sanada in the 2020 finals at 35 minutes and 12 seconds. The longest match with a decisive winner in the block stages of the tournament is Sanada vs. Kazuchika Okada in the 2019 tournament at 29 minutes and 47 seconds, 13 seconds shy of the 30-minute time limit. Conversely, the shortest match is Hirooki Goto vs. Toru Yano in the 2020 tournament at just 18 seconds.

List of winners

Tokyo Dome IWGP Heavyweight Championship challenge rights certificate

1974
The 1974 World League ran from April 5 to May 8, 1974. The tournament began with 16 wrestlers, eight Japanese and eight Internationals (called gaijin, the Japanese term for foreigners), placed into groups accordingly. All first round matches featured the Japanese against the Internationals. The top four finishers from both groups advanced to a second round of round-robin competition.

1975
The 1975 World League ran from April 4 to May 16, 1975. The tournament featured 16 wrestlers, but the Locals versus Internationals format was abolished. The top five finishers advanced to a knockout round, with the top finisher receiving a bye to the final.

1976
The 1976 World League ran from April 2 to May 11, 1976. The tournament featured 14 wrestlers. The top finisher advanced to the final match of the tournament, to face the winner of a three-wrestler round-robin semifinal round.

1977
The 1977 World League ran from April 21 to May 30, 1977. The tournament featured 11 wrestlers.

1978
The 1978 MSG League ran from April 21 to May 30, 1978. The tournament featured nine wrestlers.

1979
The 1979 MSG League ran from April 27 to June 7, 1979. The tournament featured 10 wrestlers.

1980
The 1980 MSG League ran from April 25 to June 5, 1980. The tournament featured 10 wrestlers.

1981
The 1981 MSG League ran from May 8 to June 4, 1981. The tournament featured 11 wrestlers.

1982
The 1982 MSG League ran from March 4 to April 1, 1982. The tournament featured 14 wrestlers.

† Antonio Inoki was injured and unable to compete in the final. Killer Khan, as the next highest finisher, took his place.

1983
The 1983 International Wrestling Grand Prix ran from May 6 to June 2, 1983. The tournament featured 10 wrestlers. The winner was awarded a championship belt (the original IWGP Heavyweight Championship) defended annually against the winner of the IWGP League of the year).

1984
The 1984 International Wrestling Grand Prix ran from May 11 to June 14, 1984. The tournament featured 12 wrestlers, and was the first time that the tournament featured no sort of final round.

1985
The 1985 International Wrestling Grand Prix ran from May 10 to June 15, 1985. The tournament featured 13 wrestlers, and was single-elimination. This was the first time the tournament did not feature a points system.

1986
The 1986 International Wrestling Grand Prix ran from May 16 to June 19, 1986. The tournament featured the return of the points system, with 14 wrestlers in two blocks of seven each. The top two from each block advanced to a knockout stage. The winner won the vacated IWGP Heavyweight Championship (original version).

1987
The 1987 International Wrestling Grand Prix ran from May 11 to June 12, 1987. The tournament featured 14 wrestlers in two blocks of seven each. The top finishers from each block advanced to the final, with the winner becoming the first IWGP Heavyweight Champion. Tatsumi Fujinami missed the tournament due to an injury he suffered on the IWGP Champion Series tour, but acted as a commentator for the final match.

1988
The 1988 International Wrestling Grand Prix ran from July 15 to July 29, 1988. The tournament featured five wrestlers in a single block, with the winner becoming the number one contender to IWGP Heavyweight Champion Tatsumi Fujinami for August 8.

1989
The 1989 World Cup Tournament was held from November 24 to December 7, 1989. The tournament featured 20 wrestlers in four blocks of five each.

1991
The 1991 G1 Climax was a round-robin tournament consisting of two four-man blocks, and running from August 7 to August 11, 1991.

1992
The 1992 G1 Climax was a 16-man single-elimination tournament, and was also for the vacant NWA World Heavyweight Championship. It ran from August 6 to August 12, 1992. Terry Taylor advanced to the quarterfinals, due to a shoulder injury suffered by his scheduled opponent Hiroshi Hase on August 3.

1993
The 1993 G1 Climax was once again a 16-man single-elimination tournament, held from August 3 to August 7, 1993. NJPW invited several non-NJPW wrestlers to participate in the 1993 tournament, including Hiromichi Fuyuki, Ashura Hara, Takashi Ishikawa and The Great Kabuki from WAR, and Yoshiaki Fujiwara from Pro Wrestling Fujiwara Gumi.

1994
The 1994 G1 Climax returned to the round-robin format, this time with two blocks of six. It was held from August 3 to August 7, 1994. Guest natives included Yoshiaki Fujiwara from Pro Wrestling Fujiwara Gumi and Yoshiaki Yatsu from Social Progress Wrestling Federation (SPWF).

1995
The 1995 G1 Climax was another eight-man round-robin tournament held August 11 to August 15, with the addition that the top two scorers from each block would advance to a four-man mini-tournament to decide the winner.

1996
The 1996 G1 Climax was held from August 2 to August 6, 1996, and was a round-robin tournament featuring two blocks of five. Junji Hirata suffered an injury during his match with Kensuke Sasaki, which caused him to forfeit his remaining matches.

1997
The 1997 G1 Climax was a 14-man single-elimination tournament, with Kensuke Sasaki and Buff Bagwell receiving byes to the quarterfinals. The tournament was held from August 1 to August 3.

1998
The 1998 G1 Climax was another 16-man single-elimination tournament, held between July 31 and August 2. Genichiro Tenryu, who had separated from his own WAR promotion to become a freelancer since early in the year, was invited.

1999
The 1999 G1 Climax was a 12-man round-robin tournament, held from August 10 to August 15.

2000
The 2000 G1 Climax was a round-robin tournament, featuring four blocks of five, with each block champion advancing to a four-man tournament to decide that year's winner; it was held from August 7 to August 13. Also note that the points system was modified from the original: 1 point for a victory, and zero points for a draw or loss. This was the first time that two recognized junior heavyweights; IWGP titleholder Tatsuhito Takaiwa and previous champion Jyushin Thunder Liger, were invited to compete in the heavyweight tournament.

2001
The 2001 G1 Climax was a two-block, twelve-man round-robin tournament held from August 4 to August 12. It returned to the original method of scoring, and also reintroduced the 1995 G1's format of each block's top two scorers advancing to the final four. Jyushin Thunder Liger and Minoru Tanaka were the junior heavyweight invitees.

2002
The 2002 G1 Climax was identical in structure to the previous year's, and was held from August 3 to August 11.

2003
The 2003 G1 Climax was another 12-man round-robin tournament, held from August 10 to August 17. Jun Akiyama from Pro Wrestling Noah, along with freelancer Yoshihiro Takayama were invitees.

2004
The 2004 G1 Climax was a two-block, sixteen-man tournament held from August 7 to August 15. As well as the increased number of participants, it introduced a format in which the second and third runners-up from each block would advance to a four-man tournament, the two finalists of which would advance to a second four-man tournament also featuring each block winner; the eventual winner of this tournament would win the G1 Climax. Also, it would seem that, for this particular year, matches which ended in a double countout or double disqualification would result in zero points for both competitors.

1 This was a double countout, and so neither Chono nor Nakamura received any points.

2005
The 2005 G1 Climax was another 16-man round-robin tournament, held from August 4 to August 14. It returned to the format of 2003, eliminating the "quarterfinals" seen in 2004, and simply bringing each block's top two scorers into the final four.

2006
The 2006 G1 Climax was a 10-man round-robin tournament held from August 6 to August 13.

2007
The 2007 G1 Climax, featuring twelve men in two blocks, was held from August 5 to August 12.

2008
The 2008 G1 Climax, featuring fourteen men in two blocks, was held from August 9 to August 17 over seven shows.

2009
The 2009 G1 Climax, featuring fourteen men in two blocks, was held from August 7 to August 16 over eight shows. In a tournament first, the exact tie for first place in Block A between Togi Makabe and Hiroshi Tanahashi was decided by a coin toss.

2010
The 2010 version of the G1 Climax tournament was announced in late May 2010 and was the 20th anniversary of the G1 Climax tournament. The tournament took place over eight shows between August 6 and August 15, 2010. Naomichi Marufuji was scheduled to participate in the tournament, but was forced to pull out after suffering an arm injury on July 25. On August 5, NJPW announced that Prince Devitt would replace Marufuji in the tournament. With his victory, freelancer Satoshi Kojima became the third man to have won both the G1 Climax and All Japan Pro Wrestling's Champion Carnival.

2011
The 2011 version of the G1 Climax tournament was announced on May 3, 2011. It took place over ten shows between August 1 and August 14 and included 20 participants, making it at the time the largest G1 Climax in history.

2012
The 2012 version of the G1 Climax tournament took place over nine shows between August 1 and August 12 and included 18 participants. The 24-year-old Kazuchika Okada went on to become the youngest G1 Climax winner in history, breaking the previous record held by the then 27-year-old Masahiro Chono. Okada also became the first winner since Hirooki Goto to win the tournament in his first attempt. Karl Anderson became the first foreigner to make it to the final of the tournament since Rick Rude in 1992.

2013
The 2013 version of the G1 Climax tournament took place over nine shows between August 1 and August 11 and included 20 participants. In an unprecedented move, NJPW broadcast all nine events live on internet pay-per-view (iPPV) through Niconico and Ustream. On August 8, NJPW announced that Hirooki Goto and Hiroyoshi Tenzan had suffered jaw and rib fractures respectively and would both miss the rest of the tournament.

2014
The 2014 version of the G1 Climax tournament took place between July 21 and August 10 with the final taking place in Tokorozawa, Saitama at the Seibu Dome for the first time departing Ryōgoku Kokugikan, which housed the final from every year since the tournament began. With 22 participants, the tournament marked the largest G1 Climax in history. Like the previous year, all events in the tournament were made available on iPPV through Niconico and Ustream. Kota Ibushi was scheduled to take part in the tournament, but on July 18 NJPW announced that he would have to pull out due to a concussion suffered at the beginning of the month. The following day, Tomoaki Honma was named Ibushi's replacement in the tournament.

2015
The 2015 version of the G1 Climax tournament took place between July 20 and August 16. Taking place over 19 shows, it was the longest G1 Climax in history. The final three days took place back at Ryōgoku Kokugikan. Participants in the tournament were announced on June 7. For the tournament, NJPW introduced a new format, where each show would only include five tournament matches all from the same block, giving the other participants more time to rest. Shinsuke Nakamura injured his left elbow in his second match, forcing him to forfeit his third match against Michael Elgin.

2016
The 2016 version of the G1 Climax tournament took place between July 18 and August 14. On June 27, NJPW announced the participants, which included two outsiders; Pro Wrestling Noah's Katsuhiko Nakajima and Naomichi Marufuji. Originally, former three-time G1 Climax winner and the wrestler with the most G1 Climax appearances, Hiroyoshi Tenzan, was left out of the tournament. However, on July 3, Tenzan's longtime tag team partner Satoshi Kojima gave him his spot in the tournament. Afterwards, Tenzan confirmed this would be his last G1 Climax. In the final, Canadian Kenny Omega made history, becoming the first non-Japanese winner of the tournament under its G1 Climax name as well as the first man in four years to win the tournament in his first attempt.

2017
The 2017 version of the G1 Climax tournament took place between July 17 and August 13. Prior to the tournament, NJPW held two "G1 Special" shows in Long Beach, California on July 1 and 2. On June 20, NJPW announced the participants in the tournament, which included one outsider: freelancer Kota Ibushi, competing in his third G1. Juice Robinson and Zack Sabre Jr. took part in their first G1 Climax tournament, while Yuji Nagata took part in his 19th and final tournament. The final match between Kenny Omega and Tetsuya Naito became the longest match in G1 Climax history, breaking the previous record from 2015. Following its conclusion, Dave Meltzer of the Wrestling Observer Newsletter called the 2017 G1 Climax "the best in history".

2018
The 2018 version of the G1 Climax took place from July 14 until August 12. Due to renovations at Ryōgoku Kokugikan, the final three shows for the tournament took place at Nippon Budokan, representing New Japan's first shows at that arena since 2003. The announcement of the participants, blocks and schedule took place during the 2018 Kizuna Road shows. Hiroshi Tanahashi set a then record for most points set by a wrestler in a 20-man G1 Climax with 15 points. The final match was the longest match in G1 history until it was beaten in 2020.

2019

2020

The 2020 edition of the G1 Climax took place from September 19 until October 18 with the final three days being held at Ryōgoku Kokugikan. This is the first time the tournament will not be held in the summer but in the autumn. This was due to the 2020 Summer Olympics, which were originally scheduled to be held at the same time when the tournament is usually held prior to the postponement of the Olympics due to the COVID-19 pandemic. The final match became the longest match in G1 Climax history surpassing the previous record in 2018. Kota Ibushi became the third wrestler along with Masahiro Chono and Hiroyoshi Tenzan to win two consecutive G1 Climax tournaments and the first wrestler to reach the finals for the third time in a row.

2021

The 2021 edition of the G1 Climax was announced on July 8 and took place from September 18 until October 21 with the finals taking place at Nippon Budokan. Kazuchika Okada and Jeff Cobb set the record for the most points in a 20-man G1 with 16 points each, Cobb also set the record for most consecutive wins in a single G1 Climax with 8 wins in a row. Kota Ibushi also made his fourth consecutive appearance in a G1 final. Okada would win the G1, defeating Kota Ibushi on the tournament final by referee stoppage.

2022

The 2022 edition of the G1 Climax was announced on April 9 at Hyper Battle and took place from July 16 until August 18, returning the G1 to the summer. This edition consisted of 28 participants across 4 blocks.
The Final match was between Kazuchika Okada and Will Ospreay, which Okada won by pinfall, marking Okada's 4th G1 Climax victory and becoming the 4th wrestler to win two consecutive G1 Climax tournaments, alongside Masahiro Chono, Hiroyoshi Tenzan and Kota Ibushi.

See also
Champion Carnival
N-1 Victory
Fire Festival
Ikkitousen Strong Climb
D-Oh Grand Prix
King of Gate

References

External links
G1 Climax at NJPW.co.jp 

New Japan Pro-Wrestling tournaments